Crystal Springs is a summer village in Alberta, Canada. The community borders the Summer Village of Grandview to the northwest and the Village at Pigeon Lake to the south.

History 
Crystal Springs withdrew from the Municipal District of Wetaskiwin No. 74 and was incorporated as a summer village on January 1, 1957.

Demographics 

In the 2016 Census of Population conducted by Statistics Canada, the Summer Village of Crystal Springs had a population of 51 living in 26 of its 108 total private dwellings, a  change from its 2011 population of 90.

See also 
List of communities in Alberta
List of summer villages in Alberta
List of resort villages in Saskatchewan

References

External links 

1957 establishments in Alberta
Summer villages in Alberta